The Pittsburg and Shawmut Railroad , also known as the Shawmut Line, was a short line railroad company operating passenger and freight service on standard gauge track in central and southwestern Pennsylvania. Since 2004, it has been operated as part of the Buffalo and Pittsburgh Railroad, which is owned by Genesee & Wyoming Inc.

History
The Pittsburg and Shawmut Railroad is often confused with the similarly named Pittsburg, Shawmut and Northern Railroad from which the P&S had its origins.  Further adding to the confusion is the fact that both were nicknamed the Shawmut Line, both operated in roughly the same geographic area, and both used similar diamond logos during their history. In fact the two were separate and unrelated companies after their 1916 split.

The main line consisted of approximately 88 miles (140 km) of standard gauge track extending from Brockway, Pennsylvania to Freeport, Pennsylvania.  The main shops were located in Brookville, Pennsylvania.

Beginnings
The Pittsburg and Shawmut Railroad Company began life on July 21, 1903, as the Brookville and Mahoning Railroad, leased by the Pittsburg, Shawmut and Northern Railroad.  When the PS&N declared bankruptcy in 1905, the B&M was spun off into a separate entity and was renamed in 1909 due to confusion with the Boston and Maine Railroad's initials. Like its parent, the P&S was also financially troubled in its early years.  The company struggled until corporate fortunes improved with the war mobilization of the 1940s.  Coal was the principal commodity for the line for its entire existence.  Doodlebugs and passenger trains ran on the route in the early years but had all been eliminated by 1939.

Recent History

The company acquired a ten-mile (16 km) section of Conrail track running from Sligo to Lawsonham in 1989 and reorganized it as the Red Bank Railroad.

Spelling of Pittsburg
The spelling of Pittsburgh as Pittsburg derives from the company's origins in the Pittsburg, Shawmut & Northern Railroad.  That company was chartered in 1899 when the name of Pittsburgh, Pennsylvania was commonly spelled without the h. The United States Board on Geographic Names advocated the h-less spelling from 1891 to 1911 in an effort to standardize the spelling of place names in the United States.

Management

The company operated under its own management until 1996 when it was acquired by the Genesee & Wyoming Inc.  The Genesee & Wyoming operated the Pittsburg & Shawmut Railroad under its own banner until January 1, 2004, when it was absorbed into the Buffalo and Pittsburgh Railroad, another G&W company. Simultaneously, a new company with the same name was created to purchase the property, which is now operated by the BPRR. (The P&S also acquired the residual common carrier obligation on the lines.) Several portions of the main line were abandoned before the absorption and several others since.

External links

 Buffalo and Pittsburgh Railroad
 The Shawmut Line
 Pittsburg, Shawmut & Northern Railroad Company

Pennsylvania railroads
Former Class I railroads in the United States
Railway companies established in 1909
Genesee & Wyoming
Non-operating common carrier freight railroads in the United States